Zaborze may refer to several villages in Poland:
Zaborze, Greater Poland Voivodeship (west-central Poland)
Zaborze, Kraków County in Lesser Poland Voivodeship (south Poland)
Zaborze, Oświęcim County in Lesser Poland Voivodeship (south Poland)
Zaborze, Łódź Voivodeship (central Poland)
Zaborze, Lublin Voivodeship (east Poland)
Zaborze, Łosice County in Masovian Voivodeship (east-central Poland)
Zaborze, Nowy Dwór Mazowiecki County in Masovian Voivodeship (east-central Poland)
Zaborze, Pułtusk County in Masovian Voivodeship (east-central Poland)
Zaborze, Cieszyn County in Silesian Voivodeship (south Poland)
Zaborze, Myszków County in Silesian Voivodeship (south Poland)
Zaborze, Busko County in Świętokrzyskie Voivodeship (south-central Poland)
Zaborze, Kielce County in Świętokrzyskie Voivodeship (south-central Poland)
Zaborze, Gryfino County in West Pomeranian Voivodeship (north-west Poland)
Zaborze, Świdwin County in West Pomeranian Voivodeship (north-west Poland)
Zaborze, now part of the city of Zabrze in Silesian Voivodeship (south Poland)